63P/Wild is a periodic comet in the Solar System with a current orbital period of 13.21 years.

It was first detected by Paul Wild at the Zimmerwald Observatory of the Astronomical Institute of Bern, Switzerland on a photographic plate exposed on 26 March 1960, who estimated its brightness at a magnitude of 14.3. Its elliptical orbit was then calculated to have an orbital period of 13.17 years.

Its predicted reappearance in 1973 was observed by Elizabeth Roemer of the U.S. Naval Observatory, Flagstaff, Arizona at a magnitude of 17.5. Although not found in 1986 it was rediscovered in 1999 with a magnitude of around 12.

The 2013 return was moderately favourable with magnitude again around 12.

See also
 List of numbered comets

References

Periodic comets
0063
 
Comets in 2013
19600326